The Jaron Cliffs are a line of steep, snow-covered cliffs on the south side of Mount Takahe, in Marie Byrd Land, Antarctica. They were mapped by the United States Geological Survey from ground surveys and U.S. Navy air photos, 1959–66, and were named by the Advisory Committee on Antarctic Names for Helmut P. Jaron, an aurora researcher at Byrd Station in 1963.

References

Cliffs of Marie Byrd Land